Utah State Bar is the regulatory agency established by the Utah Supreme Court to regulate the practice of law in Utah. The Utah State Bar is funded by dues from members, Bar exam dues, continuing education fees, Pro Hac Vice fees, and revenue generated by annual conventions. Beginning in 2019, the Utah State Bar, in conjunction with the Supreme Court, implemented a series of groundbreaking changes designed to improve access to justice for all individuals.

History
Starting around 1851, lawyers in the Territory of Utah would petition the Supreme Court for permission to practice law in Utah, and once approved, they became members of the bar of all the courts in the territory.  Essentially, there was a Bar in the Territory of Utah, but no bar association until 1884. Informal associations of Utah lawyers began to form no later than the early 20th century. In 1931 the Utah legislature passed a law designating the private corporation known as "Utah State Bar" to self-regulate the activities of dues-paying legal licensees in the State of Utah.

Structure
Utah State Bar is managed by a Board of Commissioners including thirteen voting members, eleven elected lawyers and two non-lawyers appointed by the Court. The Commission also includes non-voting ex officio members: the deans of the University of Utah Law School and Brigham Young University Law School, the Bar's delegate to the American Bar Association, the Utah American Bar Association members' delegate to the ABA, the president of the Young Lawyers Division, and representatives from the Women Lawyers of Utah, the Utah Minority Bar Association, the Bar's representative to the Utah Judicial Council, and the Past President of the Bar.

Utah State Bar maintains a requirement that Utah legal licensees must complete 24 credits of Continuing Legal Education (CLE) every two years.

Publications

Utah State Bar publishes the bi-monthly Utah Bar Journal.

Pornographic Email Incident
Just after 3:00 pm on Monday March 5, 2018 a NSFW email containing a large pornographic image resembling the bare breasts of a female was sent from Utah State Bar to every dues-paying member of Utah State Bar. This included over 500 dues-paying members outside of Utah. The pornographic image was opened by at least one dues-paying member who claimed to be on the house floor of the Utah State Capital and that an intern also saw the pornographic image.

References

American state bar associations
Government of Utah
1931 establishments in Utah
Organizations established in 1931